Fastway Couriers is a courier delivery services company founded in Napier, New Zealand. The company currently operates in Ireland and South Africa.

The company has operated as a franchise model since 1983, with franchising at the regional and courier level. The company was acquired by Aramex in 2016.

As part of the acquisition by Aramex, Fastway has been rebranded to Aramex in Australia and New Zealand.

With over 7,300 1-star reviews as of May 2021, Fastway Couriers was ranked as one of the worst-reviewed courier services in Australia. Despite rebranding to Aramex Australia, the service continues to receive lacklustre reviews. With over 1,100 1-star ratings as of May 2021 and an average review of 1.2 out of 5 stars, it remains one of the worst-reviewed courier services in Australia. 

Additionally, Fastway Couriers also currently rates poorly in Ireland, with approximately 80% of reviewers giving them a 1 star rating as of May 2021.

References

Logistics companies
Transport companies established in 1983
Franchises
New Zealand companies established in 1983
Transport companies of New Zealand